Monett High School is a public high school, located in Monett, Missouri which is located in Lawrence County & Barry County. It is part of the Monett R-1 School District and holds grades 9-12. As of 2019 it enrolls 772 students with a student to teacher ratio of 18:1.

Academics
Monett provides student issued Chromebooks as a way to broaden their horizons. Monett offers a "GOCAPS" program - which provides students a chance to learn outside of the traditional school setting, while earning credit, and allows them to work with local business partners on real world, hands on projects. Monett also participates in a program known as A+, in which students must maintain a 2.5 GPA and complete a certain number of service hours, most of which are completed through peer tutoring. Students who successfully complete the A+ program automatically get a free two-year scholarship to a two-year college in the state.

Students can register for dual credit courses through Missouri State University, Drury University, and Crowder college.  Monett also participated in the Advanced Placement (AP) program

Additionally, Monett hosts the Scott Tech Center that allows students to explore career opportunities in various career paths like Nursing, Welding, Child Care, Culinary arts, and more

Extracurricular Activities
Monett students can participate in a number of extracurricular activities, including:
Speech and Debate,
Theater, Academic Team/Quiz Bowl, Science Olympiad, Future Business Leaders of America, Robotics Competition, Chorale music, Marching Band, Jazz Band, Art competition, Student Council, and National Honor Society

Athletics
Monett High School's official mascot is the Cubs. They are part of the Big 8 Conference (Missouri). Football, Soccer, and Track & Field events are all held at Burl Fowler Stadium in Monett.

Baseball - Men
Basketball – Men & Women
Cheerleading - Co-ed
Cross Country – Men & Women
Football - Men
Golf – Men & Women
Soccer - Men & Women
Softball - Women
Speech and Debate - Co-ed
Swimming - Men & Women
Track and field – Men & Women
Volleyball – Women
Wrestling - Men & Women

State Championships

1971 Football (2A)
1977 Football (2A)
2008 Wrestling (2)
2016 Football (3)
2017 Softball (3)
2019 Wrestling (2)
2020 Wrestling (2)

Notable alumni

References

Public high schools in Missouri